Wilson Lake is the reservoir created by Wilson Dam as part of the Tennessee Valley Authority.  The lake stretches from Wilson Dam to Wheeler Dam.

See also
Dams and reservoirs of the Tennessee River
List of Alabama dams and reservoirs

References

Tennessee River
Reservoirs in Alabama
Bodies of water of Colbert County, Alabama
Bodies of water of Lauderdale County, Alabama
Bodies of water of Lawrence County, Alabama
Tennessee Valley Authority
Huntsville-Decatur, AL Combined Statistical Area
Decatur metropolitan area, Alabama
Landmarks in Alabama
Florence–Muscle Shoals metropolitan area